Elektra Sound Recorders was Elektra Records's recording studio in Los Angeles, California, United States located at 962 La Cienega Boulevard. Electric Entertainment currently provides video production services at this location.

History
In 1958, Jac Holzman built the first Elektra studio at 116 West 14th Street, on the northern edge of Greenwich Village.

Recordings 
 Alone Together (Dave Mason album)
 Bread (album)
 Chelsea Morning
 Don't Cry Now
 Essential Rarities
 First (David Gates album)
 Fun House (The Stooges album)
 1970: The Complete Fun House Sessions
 Guitar Man (Bread album)
 Happy Sad (album)
 Heads & Tales (album)
 I'm Easy (album)
 Jack-Knife Gypsy
 Late for the Sky
 Let It Bleed
 Lost Without Your Love
 Luxury You Can Afford
 Morrison Hotel
 Never Let Her Go
 Outlaws (Outlaws album)
 Peace Frog
 Primordial Lovers
 Roadhouse Blues
 Sniper and Other Love Songs
 Some Days You Eat the Bear
 Souvenirs (Dan Fogelberg album)
 St. Cecilia: The Elektra Recordings
 The Complete Studio Recordings (The Doors album)
 The Original Delaney & Bonnie & Friends
 The Rose (soundtrack)
 The Soft Parade
 Touch Me (The Doors song)
 Warren Zevon (album)
 Who Knows Where the Time Goes (Judy Collins album)
 Wishful Sinful

References

External links

Recording studios in California
Audio engineering
Music of Los Angeles
Sunset Boulevard (Los Angeles)
Companies based in Los Angeles
Entertainment companies based in California